The 2001–02 season saw Leeds United A.F.C. compete in the FA Premier League (known as the Barclaycard Premiership for sponsorship reasons).

Season summary
After reaching the semi-finals of the Champions League and ending the previous season in red hot form much was expected of Leeds, especially with the squad injury-free compared to the start of the previous season. United got off to a good start, including a 2–1 win over Arsenal in the second game of the season, despite being reduced to nine men. By September, back-to-back wins against Charlton and Derby had seen Leeds go top of the Premiership. Leeds also progressed in the UEFA Cup with strikers Robbie Keane and Harry Kewell scoring regularly. Leeds weren't beaten in the league until November, shortly after which manager David O'Leary finally landed prize striker Robbie Fowler from Liverpool for £11 million - O'Leary had tried to buy Fowler two seasons earlier. Over Christmas and the New Year the trial of star players Lee Bowyer and Jonathan Woodgate was back under way. Despite this, consecutive wins over Bolton, Southampton and West Ham put Leeds back on top of the league on New Year's Day, with new signing Fowler and fellow striker Mark Viduka scoring often. Just as Bowyer and Woodgate were found not guilty a shock 2–1 loss to Second Division Cardiff, knocking Leeds out of the FA Cup, kickstarted a drop in form. Leeds embarked on a run of nine straight games without a win, including being knocked out of the UEFA Cup by Dutch side PSV. United had now fallen out of the title race and although they recovered with a 2–0 win at home to Ipswich, they had lost too much ground at the top of the league and back-to-back losses against Manchester United and Tottenham ended any hope of a top 4 finish. Leeds recovered to win 4 out of their final 5 games but finished a disappointing 5th.

After the season had finished, O'Leary was sacked. He had been in charge at Leeds since October 1998, never finishing outside the Premiership top five (coming 4th, 3rd, 4th, and 5th). Leeds had also played in UEFA Cup and Champions League semi-finals during his tenure. Dispute about the real reason for O'Leary's sacking continues to this day.

Final league table

Results summary

Results by round

Players

First-team squad
Squad at end of season

Left club during season

Reserve squad
The following players did not appear in a first-team squad this season.

Results

Premier League

FA Cup

League Cup

UEFA Cup

Statistics

Appearances and goals

|-
! colspan=14 style=background:#dcdcdc; text-align:center| Goalkeepers

|-
! colspan=14 style=background:#dcdcdc; text-align:center| Defenders

|-
! colspan=14 style=background:#dcdcdc; text-align:center| Midfielders

|-
! colspan=14 style=background:#dcdcdc; text-align:center| Forwards

|-
! colspan=14 style=background:#dcdcdc; text-align:center| Players transferred out during the season

Transfers

In

Out

Loaned out

References

Leeds United F.C. seasons
Leeds United
Foot